Artur Bach (30 January 1883 – 24 April 1924 Tartu) was an Estonian educator and politician. He was a member of I Riigikogu, representing the Estonian Social Democratic Workers' Party. He was a member of the assembly since 13 October 1921. He replaced Juhan Jans. On 18 October 1921, he resigned his position and he was replaced by Peeter Treiberg.

References

1883 births
1924 deaths
Estonian Social Democratic Workers' Party politicians
Members of the Riigikogu, 1920–1923